Sir Stephen Hales (before 1331 – 1394/5), of Testerton, Norfolk, was an English soldier and politician.

Biography
Hales was born the son and heir of William Hales of Testerton and was knighted at some point before November 1372.

He took part in military campaigns in the wars with France. After being blooded in a sea battle against the Spanish off Winchelsea in 1350, he joined the army of the Black Prince in Gascony from 1355 to 1357. He was present when Edward III's forces approached Paris in the spring of 1360 and fought at the Battle of Nájera under the Black Prince in 1367.

Hales was elected a Member of Parliament for Norfolk in January 1377, January 1380, 1381, May 1382, October 1382, Feb. 1383, October 1383, November 1384 and 1386. He was a Justice of the Peace for Norfolk from 1380 to his death and was appointed High Sheriff of Norfolk and Suffolk for 1378–1379.

He married Joan, who was probably the daughter of John Novers of Swanton Novers, Norfolk. They had no children and was thus succeeded by his brother Thomas.

Notes

References

1394 deaths
English MPs January 1377
People from North Norfolk (district)
English soldiers
English knights
High Sheriffs of Norfolk
High Sheriffs of Suffolk
Year of birth uncertain
Members of the Parliament of England for Norfolk
English MPs January 1380
English MPs 1381
English MPs May 1382
English MPs October 1382
English MPs February 1383
English MPs October 1383
English MPs November 1384
English MPs 1386
Military personnel from Norfolk